Benfica is a professional football club based in Lisbon, Portugal.

Benfica may also refer to:

Places
 Benfica, Luanda, a commune of Luanda, Angola
 Benfica, Rio de Janeiro, a neighborhood in Rio de Janeiro, Brazil
 Benfica (Lisbon), a civil parish of Lisbon, Portugal

Sports clubs
 Casa Estrella del Benfica, a football club from Andorra la Vella, Andorra
 S.H. Benfica (Huambo), a football club from Huambo, Angola
 S.L. Benfica (Luanda), a football club from Luanda, Angola
 S.L. Benfica (Lubango), a football club from Lubango, Angola
 CSD Benfica, a football club from Dili, East Timor
 Benfica W.S.C., a women's association football club in Ireland
 FC RM Hamm Benfica, a football club from Luxembourg City, Luxembourg
 S.L. Benfica de Macau, a football club from Macau
 Sport Macúti e Benfica, a football club from Beira, Mozambique
 Sport Benfica e Castelo Branco, a football club from Castelo Branco, Portugal
 C.F. Benfica, a sports club from Lisbon, Portugal
 Sport London e Benfica F.C., a football club from London, England, UK

See also
 Benfica do Ribatejo, a civil parish in Almeirim, Portugal
 S.L. Benfica (disambiguation)
 São Domingos de Benfica, a civil parish of Lisbon split off from the original Benfica in 1959